José Ricardo Cortés (born 8 September 1994) is a Colombian football right winger.

Career statistics
.

References

External links
 
 

1994 births
Living people
People from Cali
Colombian footballers
Association football midfielders
Atlético Bucaramanga footballers
Club Destroyers players
Diósgyőri VTK players
FC Košice (2018) players
Nemzeti Bajnokság I players
Colombian expatriate footballers
Colombian expatriates in Bolivia
Expatriate footballers in Bolivia
Colombian expatriates in Hungary
Expatriate footballers in Hungary
Expatriate footballers in Slovakia